Town Point, also known as Kingston-upon-Hull and Logan's Lane, is a historic home located at Dover, Kent County, Delaware. It was built in three sections, with the earliest dated to about 1677. The oldest section is a brick, three bay structure consisting of two rooms and a center hall.  A one-story, brick kitchen wing was added to the original section at an early date. A five-bay frame second story was added early in the 19th century.

It was added to the National Register of Historic Places in 1972.

References

External links 

Historic American Buildings Survey in Delaware
Houses on the National Register of Historic Places in Delaware
Houses completed in 1677
Houses in Dover, Delaware
National Register of Historic Places in Dover, Delaware
1677 establishments in Delaware